Dienison Gomes do Carmo (born October 12, 1991, in Macapá), known by his nickname Cavalo, is a Brazilian footballer who plays for Botafogo–DF as right back. He already played for national competitions such as Copa do Brasil and Campeonato Brasileiro Série D for Santos–AP.

He have already played in several amapá teams, such as Independente–AP, Trem, Santana and Santos–AP, being winner of Campeonato Amapaense 2011, 2015 and 2016 editions

Career statistics

References

External links

1991 births
Living people
Brazilian footballers
People from Macapá
Association football fullbacks
Santos Futebol Clube (AP) players
Sportspeople from Amapá